SBHS may refer to:
 Slavonia-Baranja Croatian Party, a defunct political party of Croatia

Schools 
 St. Barnabas High School, The Bronx, New York, New York, United States
 Sam Barlow High School, Gresham, Oregon, United States
 San Benito High School (California), Hollister, California, United States
 San Benito High School (Texas), San Benito, Texas, United States
 San Bernardino High School, San Bernardino, California, United States
 Santa Barbara High School, Santa Barbara, California, United States
 Secondary Board High School, Cuttack, Odisha, India
 Sheepshead Bay High School, Brooklyn, New York, New York, United States
 Shirley Boys' High School, Christchurch, New Zealand
 South Bromsgrove High School, Bromsgrove, Worcestershire, England
 South Broward High School, Hollywood, Florida, United States
 South Brunswick High School (New Jersey), Monmouth Junction, New Jersey, United States
 South Burlington High School, South Burlington, Vermont, United States
 Southeast Bulloch High School, Brooklet, Georgia, United States
 Southland Boys' High School, Invercargill, New Zealand
 Stone Bridge High School, Ashburn, Virginia, United States
 Sturgis Brown High School, Sturgis, South Dakota, United States
 Sydney Boys High School, Sydney, New South Wales, Australia

 Springs Boys High School, Springs, Gauteng, South Africa